Mignane Diouf (born February 1, 1989 in Saly) is a Senegalese footballer who plays as a forward, most recently for Al-Sadd.

Career
Diouf signed for Senegal National League 2 club Diambars in 2010, aged 21, before being loaned out to Tromsø IL in Norway where he made one appearance in 2010.

On May 6, 2011, Diouf was sent on loan again, this time to the Montreal Impact in the North American Soccer League. He made his debut for Montreal on May 14, 2011, in a 2-1 loss to the Carolina RailHawks, and scored his first goal for the club on June 4 in a 2-0 win over FC Edmonton.

References

External links
 Montreal Impact bio

1989 births
Living people
Senegalese footballers
Serer sportspeople
Tromsø IL players
Montreal Impact (1992–2011) players
Eliteserien players
North American Soccer League players
Senegalese expatriate footballers
Expatriate footballers in Norway
Senegalese expatriate sportspeople in Norway
Expatriate soccer players in Canada
Senegalese expatriate sportspeople in Canada
Expatriate footballers in Morocco
Senegalese expatriate sportspeople in Morocco
Expatriate footballers in Oman
Senegalese expatriate sportspeople in Oman
Expatriate footballers in Saudi Arabia
Senegalese expatriate sportspeople in Saudi Arabia
Al-Kawkab FC players
Al-Orobah FC players
Al-Sadd FC (Saudi football club) players
Saudi First Division League players
Saudi Second Division players
Diambars FC players
Olympique Club de Khouribga players
Association football forwards
Chabab Atlas Khénifra players